Marlon Lee Maxey (born February 19, 1969) is a former American professional basketball player. During his playing career, at a height of 6'8 " (2.05 m) tall, and a weight of 250 lbs. (113 kg), Maxey, who was born in Chicago, Illinois, played at the power forward and center positions. Maxey was selected with the 28th overall draft pick, by the Minnesota Timberwolves, in the 1992 NBA draft.

College career
After attending and playing basketball at Percy L. Julian High School, in Chicago, Illinois, Maxey played college basketball for the University of Minnesota, where he played with the Minnesota Golden Gophers (1987–1988). He also played college basketball at the University of Texas at El Paso, where he played with the UTEP Miners, from 1989 to 1992.

Professional career
Maxey participated at the Portsmouth Invitational Tournament in 1992, where he was named the unanimous tourney MVP. After that, he was a second round draft pick in the 1992 NBA Draft. In an NBA career that lasted two seasons, both of them spent with the Timberwolves, Maxey played in a total of 98 regular season games. He had career NBA averages of 4.9 points and 3.7 rebounds per game.

After playing in the NBA, Maxey played professionally in Spain's ACB, Greece's, Basket League, France's Pro A, and Turkey's Super League.

References

External links 
 NBA.com: Marlon Maxey
 Basketball-Reference.com: Marlon Maxey 
 FIBAEurope.com Profile: Marlon Maxey
 RealGM.com: Marlon Maxey
 ProBallers.com: Marlon Maxey
 Eurobasket.com: Marlon Maxey
 Sports-Reference.com: Marlon Maxey
 TheDraftReview.com: Marlon Maxey

1969 births
Living people
20th-century African-American sportspeople
21st-century African-American people
African-American basketball players
American expatriate basketball people in France
American expatriate basketball people in Greece
American expatriate basketball people in Spain
American expatriate basketball people in Turkey
American men's basketball players
ASVEL Basket players
Basketball players from Chicago
CB Breogán players
CB Lucentum Alicante players
Centers (basketball)
Galatasaray S.K. (men's basketball) players
Gymnastikos S. Larissas B.C. players
Iraklis Thessaloniki B.C. players
Liga ACB players
Minnesota Golden Gophers men's basketball players
Minnesota Timberwolves draft picks
Minnesota Timberwolves players
Peristeri B.C. players
Power forwards (basketball)
UTEP Miners men's basketball players